In Search of a Sinner is a 1920 American silent comedy film directed by David Kirkland and written by John Emerson and Anita Loos. The film stars Constance Talmadge, Rockliffe Fellowes, Corliss Giles, William Roselle, Marjorie Milton and Evelyn Carter Carrington. The film was released on March 7, 1920, by First National Exhibitors' Circuit.

Cast       
Constance Talmadge as Georgianna Chadbourne
Rockliffe Fellowes as Jack Garrison
Corliss Giles as Jeffrey
William Roselle as Sam
Marjorie Milton as Helen
Evelyn Carter Carrington as Katie
Lillian Worth as Valeska
Arnold Lucy as Henry
Slim Whitaker as Roue 
Ned Sparks as Waiter
William Boshell as Policeman

References

External links

1920 films
1920s English-language films
Silent American comedy films
1920 comedy films
First National Pictures films
American silent feature films
American black-and-white films
1920s American films